Serbia competed at the World Games 2017  in Wrocław, Poland, from 20 July 2017 to 30 July 2017.

Medalists

On invitational events

References 

Nations at the 2017 World Games
2017 in Serbian sport
2017